Tencent Pictures is a Chinese film distributor and production company owned by Tencent. It has created films based on books, manhua, donghua and video games. In 2015, Tencent set up Tencent Penguin Pictures (Shanghai), a new movie production unit, focusing on online drama and minority investments in feature films.

Filmography

Undated films 
New York Will Eat You Alive
Crossfire
20,000 Miles Plan
Aura
Crazy Alien
Dark Side of the Moon
The Game of Antiques
Koseison
The Magic Blade remake
Pathfinder
The Treasure Map
The Tuzki 3D

References

External links
Tencent Pictures at cbooo.cn 

Film production companies of China
Tencent divisions and subsidiaries
Entertainment companies established in 2015
Chinese companies established in 2015